Okon  Edet Uya  (12 June 1947 – 17 April 2014) was briefly the chairman of the National Electoral Commission of Nigeria (NECON), appointed by President Ibrahim Babangida after the presidential elections of the 12 June 1993 had been annulled and the previous chairman, Humphrey Nwosu, dismissed.

Uya was of Oron origins.
He spent six years as a senior official in Nigeria's diplomatic corps, serving as Nigeria's ambassador in Argentina, Peru, Paraguay and Chile.
When a professor of history at the University of Calabar, Uya was appointed to conduct a new presidential poll after the annulment of the 12 June 1993 election. The National Republican Convention and Social Democratic Party were asked to present new candidates for a poll that it was hoped would be held by March 1994. But the confusion that followed the annulment crisis prevented Uya from conducting the election before General Sani Abacha assumed power and dismissed him from his office.
He later became the Deputy Vice Chancellor and acting Vice Chancellor of the University of Calabar. The last undergraduate course that he taught concerned the Atlantic slave trade.

Bibliography

References

Oron people
1947 births
2014 deaths
Ambassadors of Nigeria to Argentina
Ambassadors of Nigeria to Peru
Ambassadors of Nigeria to Paraguay
Ambassadors of Nigeria to Chile
Academic staff of the University of Calabar
Nigerian diplomats
People from Akwa Ibom State